Áo is the Mandarin pinyin and Wade–Giles romanization of the Chinese surname written  in Chinese character. It is romanized as Ngo in Cantonese. Ao is listed 375th in the Song dynasty classic text Hundred Family Surnames. As of 2008, it is the 261st most common surname in China, shared by 250,000 people.

Notable people
 Ao Taosun (敖陶孫; 1154–1227), Song dynasty poet
 Ao Zongqing (敖宗慶; 16th century), Ming dynasty governor of Yunnan province
 Ao Yu-hsiang (敖幼祥; born 1956), Taiwanese cartoonist
 Ao Kuo-chu (敖國珠; born 1969), Taiwanese journalist
 Ao Long (敖龍), Cantonese opera performer and actor
 Ngo Ka-nin (born 1976), Hong Kong actor
 Ao Feifan (born 1989), football player

Mythology
In Chinese mythology, the Dragon Kings of the Four Seas are surnamed Ao:

 Ao Guang, Dragon King of the East Sea
 Ao Qin (敖欽), Dragon King of the South Sea
 Ao Run (敖閏), Dragon King of the West Sea
 Ao Shun (敖順), Dragon King of the North Sea

See also
 Ou, commonly romanized as Ao in Cantonese

References

Chinese-language surnames
Individual Chinese surnames